Cuthbert Esquire Dukes OBE (24 July 1890 – 3 February 1977) was an English physician, pathologist and author, for whom the Dukes classification for colorectal cancer is named.

Career
Dukes was educated at Caterham School. He graduated with an M.D. thesis entitled Effect of severe haemorrhage and shock on the condition of the blood from the University of Edinburgh in 1914. His field of choice was pathology. He served in the Royal Army Medical Corps that was attached to the Rifle Brigade (The Prince Consort's Own) during World War I and was awarded the OBE for his services. After the war's end he became a demonstrator in bacteriology at University College in London, and in 1922, was the first pathologist to join the staff of St Mark's Hospital. It was there that he began his recognized studies on the pathology of colon cancer. He wrote several books based on his findings.

In 1924 he started the Polyposis Registry with John Lockhart-Mummery which kept data on people with inherited multiple polyps.

A meticulous researcher who took personal pleasure in the many cases in which his findings helped patients with colon cancer, Dukes, apparently in accordance to his humble Quaker faith, refused all honours despite the wishes of his former colleagues and lived quietly at his home in Wimbledon until his death at the age of 86.

He was the younger brother of British playwright Ashley Dukes and MI6 agent Sir Paul Dukes.

Selected publications

Books
 Dukes, Cuthbert (1924) Joseph Lister (1827-1912), London : Leonard Parsons.

Articles
 Dukes, Cuthbert (1935) "In the boyhood of the race" Friends' quarterly examiner; Vol.69; no.274 (Fourth Month 1935), pp. 117–126
 Dukes, Cuthbert (1937) "What does Quakerism mean to me? Friends' quarterly examiner; Vol.71; no.282 (Fourth Month 1937), p. 131-134

See also
 Pathology
 List of pathologists

References

Further reading

External links 

1890 births
1977 deaths
People educated at Caterham School
Alumni of the University of Edinburgh
Royal Army Medical Corps officers
English pathologists
English Christians
English Quakers
People from Bridgwater
British Army personnel of World War I
Presidents of the History of Medicine Society
Recipients of the St Peter's Medal
Military personnel from Somerset